Gattonside is a small village in the Scottish Borders. In 1143, the lands of Gattonside were granted to the monks of Melrose Abbey by King David I.

Gattonside was the home of modernist architect Peter Womersley (1923–1993), whose self-designed house, The Rig (1956), is now a Category B listed building.

The village is linked to Melrose, on the opposite side of the river, by the 19th-century Gattonside Suspension Bridge. Built in 1826, the bridge was repaired in 1992, and is protected as a Category B listed building. The plantation owner, Robert Waugh of Harmony Hall was a shareholder who on his death in 1832 left his shares to the poor of Melrose.

Gattonside House

Gattonside House was originally built c.1810. James Brown (died 1816), a coffee planter in Jamaica who also owned the Bryan's Hill estate at the end of his life, lived there for some years to his death. It was then sold by his sons, James Mellor Brown and Abner William Brown.

Between 1821 and 1824 Gattonside House was the home of Sir Adam Ferguson, Deputy Keeper of the Scottish Regalia and close friend of Sir Walter Scott.

The Gattonside estate was bought around 1825 by George Bainbridge (died 1844), a Liverpool merchant in the West Indies trade, and the house occupied by his son George Cole Bainbridge (1788–1839). George Cole Bainbridge had married in 1808 Jane Hobson (died 1822), daughter of Richard Hobson of Shipscarr Lodge, Leeds, and had with her a large family. The house had alterations made, around the same time, by John Smith of Darnick.

Sarah Graham Bainbridge (1810–1837), absentee owner of the Lindale estate in Jamaica, died at Gattonside House. She was a first cousin to George Cole Bainbridge, the daughter of John Bainbridge of Lindale; George Bainbridge the elder was a younger brother of John, as sons of Thomas Bainbridge (1717–1799).

Around 1850 the house was bought by General Alexander Duncan HEICS.

The house was remodelled by Sir Robert Lorimer in 1914 and listed in 1971.

References

Villages in the Scottish Borders